This article uses the Einstein summation convention for tensor/spinor indices, and uses hats for quantum operators.

In relativistic quantum mechanics and quantum field theory, the Bargmann–Wigner equations describe free particles with non-zero mass and arbitrary spin , an integer for bosons or half-integer for fermions. The solutions to the equations are wavefunctions, mathematically in the form of multi-component spinor fields.

They are named after Valentine Bargmann and Eugene Wigner.

History

Paul Dirac first published the Dirac equation in 1928, and later (1936) extended it to particles of any half-integer spin before Fierz and Pauli subsequently found the same equations in 1939, and about a decade before Bargman, and Wigner. Eugene Wigner wrote a paper in 1937 about unitary representations of the inhomogeneous Lorentz group, or the Poincaré group. Wigner notes Ettore Majorana and Dirac used infinitesimal operators applied to functions. Wigner classifies representations as irreducible, factorial, and unitary.

In 1948 Valentine Bargmann and Wigner published the equations now named after them in a paper on a group theoretical discussion of relativistic wave equations.

Statement of the equations

For a free particle of spin  without electric charge, the BW equations are a set of  coupled linear partial differential equations, each with a similar mathematical form to the Dirac equation. The full set of equations are

which follow the pattern;

(Some authors e.g. Loide and Saar use  to remove factors of 2. The entire wavefunction  has components

and is a rank-2j 4-component spinor field. Further,  are the gamma matrices, and

is the 4-momentum operator.

The operator constituting each equation, is a  matrix, because of the  matrices, and the  term scalar-multiplies the  identity matrix (usually not written for simplicity). Explicitly, in the Dirac representation of the gamma matrices:

where  is a vector of the Pauli matrices, E'' is the energy operator,  is the 3-momentum operator,  denotes the  identity matrix, the zeros (in the second line) are actually  blocks of zero matrices.

the equations are Lorentz covariant,
all components of the solutions  also satisfy the Klein–Gordon equation, and hence fulfill the relativistic energy–momentum relation,

second quantization is still possible.

Unlike the Dirac equation, which can incorporate the electromagnetic field via minimal coupling, the B–W formalism comprises intrinsic contradictions and difficulties when the electromagnetic field interaction is incorporated. An indirect approach to investigate electromagnetic influences of the particle is to derive the electromagnetic four-currents and multipole moments for the particle, rather than include the interactions in the wave equations themselves.

Lorentz group structure

The representation of the Lorentz group for the BW equations is

where each  is an irreducible representation. This representation does not have definite spin unless  equals 1/2 or 0. One may perform a Clebsch–Gordan decomposition to find the irreducible  terms and hence the spin content. This redundancy necessitates that a particle of definite spin  that transforms under the  representation satisfies field equations.

The representations  and  can each separately represent particles of spin . A state or quantum field in such a representation would satisfy no field equation except the Klein–Gordon equation.

Formulation in curved spacetime

Following M. Kenmoku, in local Minkowski space, the gamma matrices satisfy the anticommutation relations:

where  is the Minkowski metric. For the Latin indices here, . In curved spacetime they are similar:

For the Greek indices; .

A covariant derivative for spinors is given by

with the connection  given in terms of the spin connection  by:

The covariant derivative transforms like :

With this setup, equation becomes:

See also

Two-body Dirac equation
Generalizations of Pauli matrices
Wigner D-matrix
Weyl–Brauer matrices
Higher-dimensional gamma matrices
Joos–Weinberg equation, alternative equations which describe free particles of any spin
Higher-spin theory

References

Notes

Further reading

Books

Selected papers

External links

Relativistic wave equations:
Dirac matrices in higher dimensions, Wolfram Demonstrations Project
Learning about spin-1 fields, P. Cahill, K. Cahill, University of New Mexico
Field equations for massless bosons from a Dirac–Weinberg formalism, R.W. Davies, K.T.R. Davies, P. Zory, D.S. Nydick, American Journal of Physics
Quantum field theory I, Martin Mojžiš 
The Bargmann–Wigner Equation: Field equation for arbitrary spin, FarzadQassemi, IPM School and Workshop on Cosmology, IPM, Tehran, Iran

Lorentz groups in relativistic quantum physics:
Representations of Lorentz Group, indiana.edu
Appendix C: Lorentz group and the Dirac algebra, mcgill.ca
The Lorentz Group, Relativistic Particles, and Quantum Mechanics, D. E. Soper, University of Oregon, 2011
Representations of Lorentz and Poincaré groups, J. Maciejko, Stanford University
Representations of the Symmetry Group of Spacetime, K. Drake, M. Feinberg, D. Guild, E. Turetsky, 2009

Quantum mechanics
Quantum field theory
Mathematical physics